Jesús Andrés Pérez Álvarez (born 11 April 2000) is a Mexican professional footballer who plays as a midfielder for Sonora, on loan from Querétaro.

He is the half-brother of Sergio Pérez.

Career statistics

Club

Notes

Honours
Mexico U17
CONCACAF U-17 Championship: 2017

References

2000 births
Living people
Mexican footballers
Mexico youth international footballers
Association football midfielders
Club América footballers
Querétaro F.C. footballers
Cimarrones de Sonora players
Ascenso MX players
Sportspeople from Baja California